is a railway station in Kawaguchi-chō, Nagasaki, Nagasaki Prefecture, Japan. It is operated by JR Kyushu and is on the Nagasaki Main Line. It is the station where the old line and new line sections of the Nagasaki Line intersect. In front of the station is the Urakami Ekimae stop on the Nagasaki Electric Tramway.

Layout

Urakami Station has a single elevated island platform servicing two tracks. The station entrance and ticketing area are located on the ground level with the platforms on the upper level. There are two automatic ticket machines, a Midori no Madoguchi ticket office and two SUGOCA card readers instead of automatic ticket gates.

Surrounding area 
In front of the station is the Urakami Ekimae stop of the Nagasaki Electric Tramway. Behind the station is a hospital, and nearby are condos, concert halls, broadcast stations and schools among other things. Many of the people who use this station are commuters to these places.

Educational facilities
Kassui High School and Junior High School
Nagasaki Nishi High School
Fuchi Junior High School
Zenza Elementary School
Sakamoto Elementary School
Kitakyushu Preparatory School
Nagasaki University School of Medicine
Nagasaki University School of Dentistry

Medical care
Nagasaki University Hospital of Medicine and Dentistry
Japanese Red Cross Nagasaki Atomic Bomb Hospital
Nagasaki Prefecture Medical Association Hall

Cultural facilities
Nagasaki National Peace Memorial Hall for the Atomic Bomb Victims
Nagasaki Atomic Bomb Museum
Nagasaki City Peace Hall
Nagasaki City Museum of History and Folklore
Nagasaki Brick Hall

Media
Nagasaki Shimbun
Nagasaki Cultural Telecasting Corporation

Usage
On average 3,801 people use this station per day (2005 estimate).

History

When this station first opened on July 22, 1897, it was called Nagasaki Station. Even today there is a stone monument in one corner of the station plaza which reads "The Site of Nagasaki Station" (「長崎駅址」). On August 9, 1945 the station was destroyed by the nuclear bomb dropped on Nagasaki. 

The station was rebuilt as an elevated station and reopened on March 28, 2020. The elevation of Urakami Station, together with Nagasaki Station, which started in 2009 as a grade separation project to abolish busy level crossings, is completed in preparation for the Nishi Kyushu Shinkansen.

1897-07-22 - Opens for business as Nagasaki Station, the terminal station of the Nagasaki Line of Kyushu Railways.
1905-04-05 - The line extends and the station is renamed to Urakami Station.
1907-07-01 - The station becomes nationally run according to the nationalization of Kyushu Railways.
1909-10-12 - Japanese National Railways renames the line the Nagasaki Main Line (長崎本線).
1945-08-09 - Damaged by the atomic bombing.
1972-10-02 - The "new line" section of the Nagasaki Main Line opens and Urakami Station becomes a junction for the new and old sections of the line.
1976-06-06 - The track between Tosu Station and Nagasaki Station (Nagasaki) becomes electrified.
1987-04-01 - Japanese National Railways privatizes and JR Kyushu becomes the station's operator.
2013-12-14 - The existing station building is demolished and a temporary station building is built in preparation of station elevation.
2020-03-28 - The station is rebuilt and reopened as an elevated station.

Adjacent stations

※Some trains are different in a station to stop.

References

Nagasaki Main Line
Buildings and structures in Nagasaki
Railway stations in Nagasaki Prefecture
Railway stations in Japan opened in 1897